San José de Feliciano is a city in the north of the province of Entre Ríos, Argentina, near the border with Corrientes.

The city was officially founded in 1818. Its name is an homage to Saint Joseph and to Feliciano Rodríguez, who accompanied Juan de Garay during the foundation of Santa Fe.

The area is traversed by many streams and punctuated by forests of palm trees, alternating with natural pasture lands which are employed to raise cattle and sheep. The streams and the nearby Guayquiraró River are adequate for fishing.

References
 
 Entre Ríos Total.
 Turismo Entre Ríos.

Populated places in Entre Ríos Province